Kaleb James Ort (born February 5, 1992) is an American professional baseball pitcher for the Boston Red Sox of Major League Baseball (MLB).

Career
Ort grew up in Lowell, Michigan, and played college baseball at Aquinas College in Grand Rapids, Michigan; however he was not selected in the MLB draft.

Joliet Slammers
On October 7, 2015, Ort signed with the Joliet Slammers of the independent Frontier League. In his first professional season, he appeared in 20 games, starting 12, and posted a 3-4 record and 6.05 ERA with 61 strikeouts in as many innings pitched. 

On September 23, 2016, Ort signed a minor league contract with the Arizona Diamondbacks. However, he did not make an appearance for the organization before he was released on March 21, 2017. After returning to Joliet, he made one appearance for the team in 2017, tossing two scoreless innings and striking out three.

New York Yankees
On May 16, 2017, Ort signed a minor league contract with the New York Yankees organization. He spent the remainder of the season split between the rookie-level Pulaski Yankees and the Low-A Staten Island Yankees, accumulating a 3-0 record and 1.38 ERA with 39 strikeouts and 10 saves in 26.0 innings pitched. In 2018, Ort made 35 appearances between the High-A Tampa Tarpons and Double-A Trenton Thunder, working to a combined 2-2 record and 3.74 ERA with 69 strikeouts and 3 saves in 55.1 innings pitched.

Ort played the 2019 season with Staten Island, Trenton, and the Triple-A Scranton/Wilkes-Barre RailRiders, pitching to a 6-0 record and 3.40 ERA with 78 strikeouts and 4 saves in 50.1 innings of work. He did not play in a game in 2020 due to the cancellation of the minor league season because of the COVID-19 pandemic.

Boston Red Sox
On December 10, 2020, Ort was selected by the Boston Red Sox during the minor-league phase of the Rule 5 draft. Ort opened the 2021 season in Triple-A with the Worcester Red Sox. On September 10, the Red Sox added Ort to their active roster. Ort was returned to Worcester, and removed from the 40-man roster, on September 14. In 42 relief appearances with Worcester, Ort recorded 19 saves with a 2.98 earned run average (ERA) while striking out 62 batters in  innings pitched.

Ort returned to Worcester to begin the 2022 season, pitching out of the bullpen as a closer. He was added to Boston's active roster on July 9, and made his first MLB appearance of the season the next day. He split time between Worcester and Boston during August, and spent almost all of September with Boston. In 25 relief appearances with Boston, Ort pitched to a 1–2 record with one save and a 6.35 ERA while striking out 27 batters in  innings. On September 29, 2022, Ort recorded his first ever MLB save by pitching a scoreless 9th inning against the Baltimore Orioles.

See also
Rule 5 draft results

References

External links

SoxProspects scouting report
Former Aquinas pitcher preps for return of baseball from WXMI via YouTube

1992 births
Living people
Baseball players from Grand Rapids, Michigan
Major League Baseball pitchers
Boston Red Sox players
Aquinas Saints baseball players 
Joliet Slammers players
Pulaski Yankees players
Staten Island Yankees players
Trenton Thunder players
Tampa Tarpons players
Scranton/Wilkes-Barre RailRiders players
Worcester Red Sox players